is a retired Japanese football player and current U18 head coach of Avispa Fukuoka.

National team career
In June 2005, Nakamura was selected Japan U-20 national team for 2005 World Youth Championship. At this tournament, he played full time in all 4 matches as right side back and right side midfielder.

Coaching career
After retiring at the end of 2019, Nakamura was hired as U18 head coach of his former club, Avispa Fukuoka.

Club statistics
Updated to 23 February 2017.

1Includes Emperor's Cup.
2Includes J.League Cup.
3Includes Suruga Bank Championship and J1 Promotion Playoffs.

National team career statistics

Appearances in major competitions

Awards and honours

Club
 FC Tokyo
J2 League (1) : 2011
Emperor's Cup (1) : 2011
J.League Cup (1) : 2009
Suruga Bank Championship (1) : 2010

References

External links

1985 births
Living people
Association football people from Nagasaki Prefecture
Japanese footballers
Japan youth international footballers
J1 League players
J2 League players
Avispa Fukuoka players
FC Tokyo players
Omiya Ardija players
V-Varen Nagasaki players
Association football midfielders